Lynceus brachyurus, known generally as the holarctic clam shrimp or common lynceus, is a species of clam shrimp in the family Lynceidae. It is found in Europe.

References

Further reading

 

Diplostraca
Articles created by Qbugbot
Crustaceans described in 1776
Taxa named by Otto Friedrich Müller